James Warren Fuller (July 5, 1945 – September 1, 2021) was an American college football coach and athletics administrator. He served as the head football coach at Jacksonville State University from 1977 to 1983, compiling a record of 54–25. Fuller was also the athletic director at Jacksonville State from 2003 to 2008.

Fuller died from complications of COVID-19 on September 1, 2021, during the COVID-19 pandemic in Texas. He was 76.

Head coaching record

References

External links
 Jacksonville State Athletics Hall of Fame profile

1945 births
2021 deaths
Alabama Crimson Tide football coaches
Alabama Crimson Tide football players
East Carolina Pirates football coaches
Jacksonville State Gamecocks football coaches
Jacksonville State Gamecocks athletic directors
People from Fairfield, Alabama
Coaches of American football from Alabama
Players of American football from Alabama
Deaths from the COVID-19 pandemic in Texas